The Samyavadi Sangstha ('Communist Organization') was a political party in West Bengal, India. It was formed after a split in the West Bengal unit of the Revolutionary Socialist Party in 1950. Samyavadi Sangstha was led by Promode Sinha Roy and N. Samajpati. In 1954 the organization merged with two other groups, forming the United Marxist League (later renamed as the Communist League).

References

Political parties established in 1951
Political parties disestablished in 1952
Defunct communist parties in India
Defunct political parties in West Bengal
1951 establishments in West Bengal